Haydn Inlet is an ice-filled inlet indenting the west coast of Alexander Island, Antarctica, lying between Mozart Ice Piedmont and Handel Ice Piedmont. Schubert Inlet lies to the south and the Lassus Mountains are immediately north. It was first seen from the air and roughly mapped by the United States Antarctic Service, 1939–41. It was resighted from the air and photographed by the Ronne Antarctic Research Expedition, 1947–48, and remapped from these photos by D. Searle of the Falkland Islands Dependencies Survey in 1960. The inlet was named by the UK Antarctic Place-Names Committee for Joseph Haydn, the Austrian composer.

See also
 Fauré Inlet
 Verdi Inlet
 Weber Inlet

Further reading 
 Defense Mapping Agency  1992, Sailing Directions (planning Guide) and (enroute) for Antarctica, P 379

References

Inlets of Alexander Island
Joseph Haydn